Discount is a 2014 French comedy-drama film directed by Louis-Julien Petit.

Cast 
  as Gilles 
 Corinne Masiero as Christiane  
 Pascal Demolon as Alfred  
 Sarah Suco as Emma 
 M'Barek Belkouk as Momo 
 Pablo Pauly as Hervé 
 Zabou Breitman as Sofia Benhaoui  
 Francesco Casisa as Francesco 
 Hafid F. Benamar as Abril

References

External links 
 

2014 films
2014 comedy-drama films
2010s French-language films
French comedy-drama films
2014 directorial debut films
2010s French films